Water polo was contested for men only at the 1986 Asian Games at the Jamsil Indoor Swimming Pool, Seoul, South Korea from 27 September to 2 October 1986.

China won the gold medal in round robin competition with a perfect record, South Korea finished second with the silver medal, Singapore won the bronze by better goal difference comparing to the 4th placed team Iran.

Medalists

Results

Final standing

References
 Asian Games water polo medalists

External links
Results

 
1986 Asian Games events
1986
Asian Games
1986 Asian Games